Sämisch and its equivalent spelling Saemisch are surnames of German origin. People with those names include:

 Edwin Theodor Saemisch (1833-1909), German ophthalmologist
 Friedrich Sämisch (1896-1975), German chess grandmaster
 King's Indian, Saemisch, 5...O-O
 King's Indian Defence, Sämisch Variation
 Nimzo-Indian, Saemisch variation

See also
 
 
 

Surnames of German origin